Liebschützberg is a municipality in the district Nordsachsen, in Saxony, Germany.

Until 1991 the territory of Liebschützberg and its 1,600 residents were part of the town of Borna. During the administrative reform of Saxony which followed the reunification of Germany Liebschützberg became an independent self-governing community (gemeinde), effective December 31, 1990. The experience of municipal reform in Liebschützberg is a subject of a study by Andreas Kretschmar (who is, since 2001, mayor of nearby Oschatz).

Twin towns
Liebschützberg is twinned with:

  Gailingen, Germany

Notes 

Nordsachsen